The blue-fronted fig parrot (Cyclopsitta gulielmitertii) is a species of parrot in the family Psittaculidae.
It is found in Salawati and the Bird's Head Peninsula in New Guinea.
Its natural habitat is subtropical or tropical moist lowland forests.

Taxonomy and systematics 
The blue-fronted fig parrot is one of four species in the genus Cyclopsitta.

The generic name Cyclopsitta is from the mythical Cyclops and the Modern Latin psitta, meaning parrot. The specific epithet gulielmitertii is in honour of William III, King of the Netherlands, and is derived from the Medieval Latin Guilelmus, meaning William, and Latin tertius, meaning third. Alternative names for the species include William's fig parrot and King of Holland fig parrot.

Description 
The blue-fronted fig parrot is primarily green with a black bill, white face with a black patch. Males have orange breasts while females have orange patches on their faces.

Distribution and habitat 
It inhabits lowland forest on New Guinea, the Bird's Head Peninsula and Salawati.

Behaviour and ecology 
The blue-fronted fig fig parrot typically stays in small flocks of 6-10 individuals. It mainly inhabits the canopy, but can also be found in lower stories.

Diet 
Mainly feeds on fig seeds, but also on seeds of Glochidion and Acacia auriculaeformis. It also eats the flower heads of Poikilospermum plants.

Breeding 
It breeds from December to June. The nest is typically a hole made in an arboreal termite mound, but may also be made in epiphytes. In captivity, clutches are usually of 2 eggs, although they may be from 1-3 eggs, and the incubation period is 20-22 days, with a nestling period of 35-42 days.

Status 
The blue-fronted fig fig parrot is listed as least-concern by the IUCN.

References

Cyclopsitta
Birds of New Guinea
Birds described in 1866
Taxonomy articles created by Polbot